Cebrones del Río, Cebrones del Ríu in Leonese language, is a municipality located in the province of León, Castile and León, Spain. According to the 2010 census (INE), the municipality had a population of 560 inhabitants.

See also

 Kingdom of León
 Leonese language
 Llión
 Province of Llión

References

Municipalities in the Province of León
Tierra de La Bañeza
Astures